The Laffly S15 was a family of all-terrain military vehicles from French manufacturer Laffly that shared the same six-wheel drive chassis. They were used by French forces during World War II.

Variants
 The Laffly S15T was a light artillery tractor that was used to tow light field artillery pieces such as modernized variants of the 75 mm mle 1897 field gun and Canon de 105 court mle 1935 B howitzer.
 A personnel carrier and reconnaissance vehicle based on the same chassis was designated as Laffly S15R. It had a different, lighter rear cab and a different transmission that allowed for higher road speed.
 The Laffly S15TOE (théâtre d'opérations extérieures: "overseas theatre of operations") was a scout car designed and built for service in French African colonies. The S15 chassis was preserved, but an armoured cabin protected the engine and crew, with a small turret that was armed with one single Reibel machine gun.
 The Laffly W15T was a low-profile version of the S15T. It was made by Hotchkiss and was used to tow the 47 mm Model 1931 anti-tank gun.
 The ambulance version was named S15C.
W-15 TCC (Chasseur de char, "tank hunter") - 47mm SA mle 1937 anti-tank gun produced in haste in mid-1940.

Foreign use
When France delivered 41 Renault R-35 tanks to Romania in 1939, a number of Laffly S15T artillery tractors were also delivered. These gun tractors were used by the 2nd Armoured Regiment's support services.

Gallery

References
Notes

Bibliography
 
 G.N. Georgano, World War Two Military Vehicles: Transport & Halftracks, Osprey Publishing, 2004, 
 Scafes, Cornel I; Scafes, Ioan I; Serbanescu, Horia Vl (2005). Trupele Blindate din Armata Romana 1919-1947. Bucuresti: Editura Oscar Print. 
 Vauvillier, F. & Touraine, J.-M. L'automobile sous l'uniforme 1939-40, Massin, 1992, 

Artillery tractors
World War II vehicles of France